Fanny González Franco (1934 in Pensilvania, Caldas – November 7, 1985 in Bogotá) was a Colombian lawyer. She graduated from the Pontifical Bolivarian University (university of which she was the first woman graduated as a lawyer, in 1958), she was also the first woman to be a magistrate of the Supreme Court of Justice of Colombia. She died in the Palace of Justice siege when the building was attacked and occupied by the M-19 guerrillas in November 1985.

References

Colombian women lawyers
20th-century  Colombian lawyers
20th-century Colombian women
1934 births
1985 deaths
20th-century women lawyers
People from Caldas Department
Pontifical Bolivarian University alumni